The Ilyushin Il-114 (Russian Илью́шин Ил-114) is a Russian twin-engine turboprop airliner, designed for local routes. Intended to replace the Antonov An-24, it first flew in 1990. A total of 20 Il-114s have been built.

Production of the Il-114 was temporarily suspended in July 2012, with the sixth and last aircraft delivered to Uzbekistan Airlines on 24 May 2013. In 2016, the company stated that production would be restarted with all-Russian parts, with a new first flight in 2019 and the first aircraft in commercial service in 2021. The decision to end production adheres to the Uzbek government's decision to convert the Tashkent factory to other production lines (namely structural units, household purpose products, spare parts for cars and agricultural equipment), despite Russian interest in keeping the production line and a reportedly high demand prospect for the aircraft. This has translated in an October 2013 announcement by a plant representative, that production is to be resumed after the factory solved financial matters and also due to the interest of a "Russian party".

Design and development
In June 1986, the Ilyushin OKB began work on a replacement for the Antonov An-24, large numbers of which remained in service with Aeroflot. Development of the new aircraft was expected to be relatively simple, with the first flight programmed to take place in 1989, with service entry in 1992.

Ilyushin's design, the Il-114, is a low-wing, twin-turboprop monoplane, with an airframe constructed mainly of metal, with composite materials used for non-structural parts. The aircraft is powered by two Klimov TV7-117S turboprop engines, driving six-bladed propellers. The undercarriage is a retractable nosewheel undercarriage, while double-slotted trailing edge flaps are fitted to the wings. Unlike previous Soviet airliners, which had a large flight crew, the Il-114 is flown by a crew of two, who are provided with electronic flight instruments. Up to 64 passengers are accommodated in the aircraft's cabin, with passengers' baggage carried in compartments at the front and rear of the cabin, rather than under the cabin floor.

The first prototype made its maiden flight from Zhukovsky Airfield on 29 March 1990. Development was slowed by technical problems (including delays with the TV7-117 engines), and by organisational and financial problems associated with the breakup of the Soviet Union, with the Il-114 to be built at the Tashkent Aviation Production Association in soon-to-be independent Uzbekistan. The second prototype did not fly until 24 December 1991. This second prototype crashed, killing seven of nine people aboard, on 5 July 1993, causing the Russian government to withdraw funding from the Il-114, although the OKB continued development with its own money. The Il-114 finally received airworthiness certification on 26 April 1997.

Operational history

Since Vyborg was forced to shut down in July 2010, Uzbekistan Airways was the sole operator of the type until May 2018. As of May 2018, no further orders had been placed for the Ilyushin 114.

In the winter of 2013-2014 the aircraft was scheduled for the following routes:
 Together with the Airbus A320 for flights between Tashkent and Karshi, Navoi, Nukus as well as Urgench.
 Together with the Boeing 757 for flights between Tashkent and Termez.
 Together with the Airbus A320 and the Boeing 757 for flights between Tashkent and Bukhara

Though the aircraft is not scheduled for other flights, following ad hoc changes it is also (though rarely) flown to other destinations in Uzbekistan. This also includes international connections: though these are no longer scheduled for the Ilyushin 114, the aircraft is sometimes used ad hoc on flights between Tashkent and Ashgabad as well as Bishkek. Uzbekistan Airways frequently changed aircraft prior to flights in order to allow for optimal usage of aircraft space in relation to actual demand.

From 2005, an Il-114 was converted into a flying testbed by Agat and Radar-MMS. With a capability to loiter for 14 hours, Agat and Radar-MMS have turned it into an advanced-technology MPA demonstrator. Il-114 RA93001 aircraft demonstrated the transmission of telemetry and targeting data in real time using a wide-band secure datalink using the Kasatka rescue and targeting complex during IMDS’2015 maritime show. This Il-114 has a FLIR under the nose, a magnetometer in the tail section, a semi-automatic sonobuoy dispenser, and two pylons under the fuselage for sensor pods or Kh-35 anti-ship missiles. On the right side of the fuselage, a GSh-2-23 twin-barrel 23-mm rapid fire cannon pod can be installed, with conformal metric-band antennas on both sides. This aircraft has two radars, one (KS-9) working in metric waveband (range up to 50 km) and the other (KS-1 or Zarya) in centimetric waveband (range 300 km). An additional antenna is in an underbelly dome for 360-degree coverage.

After the Russian invasion of Ukraine in 2014, Russia is looking to modernize the Il-114. It will replace the Ukraine-made An-140T that was selected before, to refresh the Russia Air Force's medium transport aircraft fleet of An-26s and An-72s. Ilyushin is also offering the Maritime Patrol version of the aircraft to the Russian navy that can patrol for up to ten hours. It can be armed with 1.5 tons of sonobuoys and depth charges, with modern search-and-attack radar, magnetic anomaly detector and a thermal imager. The Il-114MP is intended to supplement and may then replace the ageing Il-38.

President Putin has ordered a study into resuming Ilyushin Il-114 turboprop production at the Aviakor plant in Samara, southeast of Moscow, with results of the assessment due in September 2014. Possible improvements can include updated engines and avionics, rear cargo ramp/door, structural strengthening, digitization of engineering drawings. China may be interested in the modernized Il-114.

The Russian naval service chief Maj. Gen. Igor Kozhin announced that the Russian navy is looking for “a modern and suitable universal platform” to replace the aging Il-20/Il-38 MPA fleet. Selection will be made in the period of 2015–16. A Maritime Patrol version of the Il-114 twin-turboprop airliner most likely will be a candidate. According to Georgy Antsev, general director and designer for Morinformsystem-Agat, “In my view, the Il-114 is the best choice for the Russian navy”. Companies promoting the Il-114 as an MPA include Agat, Ilyushin, Radar-MMS and others.

Il-114-300
Ilyushin Company chief designer Sergey Gromov announced that they will develop a version of the Il-114 aircraft fitted with ski and wheel landing gear for the Arctic Region. The development program will produce three Il-114 aircraft by 2020 with Gidromash/Hydromash JSC (Nizhny Novgorod). It will be designated Il-114-300 and will be produced using only Russian-produced components. Four versions of Il-114-300 would be developed including a passenger version by 2019; Cargo and Arctic versions derived from the passenger version, and a Maritime Patrol Aircraft, whose prototype was showcased at Army-2015 forum.

Russia's United Aircraft Corporation (UAC) expected that the Russian government would decide later on in 2015 whether to allow the state-backed aerospace group to build a new 50-to-70-seat passenger version of the Ilyushin Il-114. At Moscow's MAKS airshow on 26 August 2015, UAC president Yuri Slyusar said he favors building the new Il-114-300 model but awaits the Kremlin's endorsement.

In December 2016, Russian President Vladimir Putin stated that production of the aircraft will be at the Nizhny Novgorod plant Sokol, starting in 2019–2020. Until 2025, almost 56 billion rubles from the state budget will finance the construction of 100 Il-114 planes. However, UAC president Yury Slusar announced at the Paris Air Show on 20 June 2017 that the production site was changed to the MiG production centre at Lukhovitsy, close to Moscow. It is expected that the plant can produce 12–18 Ilyushin Il-114 regional aircraft per year to supply Russian airlines that will need around 60–80 turboprops with 50–60 seats over the next 10 to 15 years, said Slusar.

At the Paris Air Show in June 2017, a memorandum of understanding (MOU) between Pratt & Whitney Canada (P&WC) and Ilyushin Joint Stock Co. was signed for P&WC to provide two PW127H engines to restart the Ilyushin Il-114-100 regional turboprop aircraft program.

The Il-112V, being developed from the Il-114 airliner, will replace Russia's aging fleet of Antonov An-26s, as the LVTS (Russian acronym for Lightweight Military-Transport Aircraft). The Ilyushin Il-112V tactical airlifter for the Russian air force was forecast to make its maiden flight in the summer of 2017, according to Yuri Slyusar, president of the United Aircraft Corporation (UAC), but it was subsequently delayed. On 9 November 2015, Russian Deputy Prime Minister Dmitry Rogozin reiterated that the Ilyushin Il-114 will be produced in the Sokol plant in Nizhny Novgorod.

In July 2017, it was announced that Russia's United Aircraft Corp. (UAC) had signed a letter of intent with State Transport Leasing Co. for 50 Ilyushin Il-114-300s. Although the delivery schedule was not disclosed, the manufacturer and lessor are expected to sign a preliminary agreement on terms and conditions before the end of 2017.
In 2017, the Kremlin injected ₽9.6 billion ($ million) into the Il-114-300 and for three years from 2018, UAC plans to invest ₽ billion ($ million) for the Il-114-300.

From February 2020, new Il-114-300 is being built, entirely from domestic parts and using modern technology. Modern variant will carry 68 passengers, with a range of 2000 km.

On November 28, 2020, the renovated Il-114 had started its first ground testing at an unspecified airfield within Moscow.

On January 19, 2021 the renovated Il-114 made the second flight.

Under a plan announced in June 2022 to bring the proportion of domestically produced aircraft to 80% of the Russian fleet by the end of the decade following the international sanctions brought in after the 2022 Russian invasion of Ukraine, around 70 Ilyushin Il-114-300s are expected to be produced by the end of the decade.

Variants
 Il-114 – The first production model with TV7-117S engines and 64 passengers
 Il-114-100 – First flown on January 26, 1999 with PW-127H turboprops, 64 passengers.
 Il-114-300 – Truncated variant with two Klimov TV7-117SM engine. Fuselage is shorter, carrying 52–68 passengers.
 Il-114T – Cargo transport version, first flown on September 14, 1996. Delivered to Zhukovski for certification tests in March 2001. Two aircraft have been built by April 2001. Eight airframes were sitting at the TAPO plant as of May 2013.
 Il-114P – Maritime patrol version.
 Il-114MP – Maritime patrol/strike version.
 Il-114LL – Flying laboratory
 Il-114FK – Military reconnaissance, elint, photo builder or cartographic map version.
 Il-114PR – SIGINT/AEW
 Il-140 – AWACS
 Il-140M – maritime patrol, ecological monitoring, search and rescue.
 Il-140M Agat – Radar-MMS testbed – advanced-technology MPA demonstrator

Operators
Current:

 Ilyushin Design Bureau

Orders:
KrasAvia
Polar Airlines

Former:

 Vyborg Airlines (2)

 Uzbekistan Airways (6)

Specifications (Il-114)

Accidents
 On July 5, 1993, a test example of Ilyushin Il-114 suffered a crash during testing at Ramenskoye Airport, due to crew error when pre-takeoff engine run-up protocol was not followed and both engines stalled on throttle-back during climbout. 5 of 9 crewmembers were killed.
 On December 5, 1999, a cargo version of the Ilyushin Il-114 suffered a crash during testing at Domodedovo Airport, killing five and injuring two.

See also

References

Sources

External links

 Ilyushin HP(Il-114)
 Ilyushin HP(Il-114-100)
 Ilyushin HP(Il-114-300)
 Il-114 production list
 Il-114 at Aviation Safety Network 2 accidents.

Il-114
1990s Soviet and Russian airliners
Low-wing aircraft
Aircraft first flown in 1990
Twin-turboprop tractor aircraft